European Journal of Health Law is published by Brill Publishers. It was first published in 1994 and replaced a journal entitled Medicine and Law to reflect a move away from focusing only on clinical negligence litigation. The journal publishes peer-reviewed scholarly articles, notes, reports, and book reviews. It is currently edited by Jos Dute, Herman Nys (Editor-in-chief), and Henriette Roscam Abbing. It is the official journal of the European Association of Health Law.

References

External links
 

English-language journals
Quarterly journals
Medical law journals
Health law journals
Brill Publishers academic journals